Farini may refer to:

 Farini, Croatia, a village in the Višnjan municipality
 Farini, Emilia-Romagna, a town and comune in Italy
 Luigi Carlo Farini (1812-1866), Prime Minister of Italy
 Domenico Farini (1834-1900), soldier and politician, son of Luigi Carlo Farini
 The Great Farini (1838–1929), an entertainer